The Man Who Died in His Boat is the ninth studio album by American musician Liz Harris under the stage name Grouper. It was released on February 4, 2013 on Kranky.

The album consists of outtakes from the previous several years, when she was in the process of recording Dragging a Dead Deer Up a Hill. A photograph of Harris' mother is featured on the cover art.

Recording
In a press release, Harris explained the title The Man Who Died in His Boat:

Speaking of the main protagonist implied in the title of the album, Drowned in Sound columnist Tim Peyton writes: "The mysterious pathos of this incident suits Grouper well. As Harris explains, 'the boat never crashed or capsized... (it) just slipped off somehow. And the boat, like a riderless horse, eventually came back home.' This haunting return of an unmanned vessel is spooky in a similar way to Harris's ethereal, multi tracked vocals."

Critical reception

The aggregate review site Metacritic assigns an average score of 81 out of 100 to The Man Who Died in His Boat based on 17 reviews, indicating "universal acclaim".

The song "Vital" was chosen as "Best New Track" by Pitchfork on December 20, 2012, and the site later placed it at number 88 on their list of the Top 100 Tracks of 2013.

Track listing

References 

2013 albums
Grouper (musician) albums
Kranky albums